Marshfield, also known as Old Marsh Home Place, is a historic plantation house located near Trenton, Edgefield County, South Carolina.   The original house, built about 1831, rests on a foundation of brick and granite rocks. The house is an L-shaped, one-story frame residence with additions and alterations made in the late-19th and early-20th centuries.  Also located on the property are the contributing early-19th century shed or "smokehouse"; an early 19th-century house, constructed of hand-hewn and pegged timbers and containing a stone fireplace; the Marsh family cemetery; and the archaeological remains of additional outbuildings.

It was listed on the National Register of Historic Places in 1995.

References

Plantation houses in South Carolina
Houses on the National Register of Historic Places in South Carolina
Houses completed in 1831
Houses in Edgefield County, South Carolina
National Register of Historic Places in Edgefield County, South Carolina